Flesh Coffin is the second studio album by American deathcore band Lorna Shore. It was released on February 17, 2017 through Outerloop Records, their only album with the label. The album was self-produced by the band along Carson Slovak and Grant McFarland. It is the last album to feature vocalist Tom Barber, rhythm guitarist Connor Deffley, and founding bassist Gary Herrera.

Critical reception

The album received mostly positive reviews from critics. Joe Smith-Engelhardt of Exclaim! gave it 6 out of 10 and said: "As a whole, Flesh Coffin has a very dynamic sound, but it's sullied slightly by a surplus of filler. The moments when the band show their vast range of talent are constantly being overshadowed by the never-ending blur of aggression that leaves the listener wondering where each song begins and ends." New Noise gave the album a positive review and stated: "There's no doubt that Lorna Shore's sophomore record will go down as one of the best deathcore albums in recent memory. Their form of the style imagines Carnifex's blackened deathcore, except much more technical and melodic. It's impressive how catchy such a dark record can be, and given how disappointing aspects of their past work were, Lorna Shore has to be praised for their ability to regroup and improve. Here's hoping we get something even better in a couple years, even if Flesh Coffin is quite excellent."

New Transcendence praised the album saying, "Few and far between are the deathcore albums that are as beautifully nostalgic as they are contemporary and comprehensive—but Flesh Coffin is surely one of them. With speed and scathing fretwork enough to give old-school deathcore addicts a taste of truly death-metal-infused heavy musicianship, yet murderously heavy, stuttering and skin-peeling breakdowns blistering enough to make downtempo bands feel like top-40 pop, Lorna Shore have proven themselves masters of metallic integration into modern, malicious deathcore. Barber's vocals are at the top of their game, with the rest of Lorna Shore's instrumental writing being second-to-none to boot. Flesh Coffin is pounds upon pounds of feisty, furious power—an album sure to entomb any set of ears that subject themselves to it."

Track listing

Personnel
Credits adapted from Discogs.

Lorna Shore
 Tom Barber – vocals
 Adam De Micco – lead guitar
 Connor Deffley – rhythm guitar
 Gary Herrera – bass
 Austin Archey – drums

Additional personnel
 Carson Slovak and Grant McFarland – production, mixing
 Lorna Shore – production
 Zakk Cervini – mastering
 Enlighten Creative Studio – logo
 Lance Rowe – layout

Charts

References

2017 albums
Lorna Shore albums